|}

The Mehl-Mülhens-Rennen is a Group 2 flat horse race in Germany open to three-year-old thoroughbred colts and fillies. It is run at Cologne over a distance of 1,600 metres (about 1 mile), and it is scheduled to take place each year in May.

It is Germany's equivalent of the 2,000 Guineas Stakes, a famous race in England.

History
The event was established in 1871, and it was originally held at Hoppegarten as the Henckel-Rennen. It was named after the Henckel von Donnersmarck family. It was initially contested over 2,000 metres, and it was shortened to 1,600 metres in 1904. It was staged at Grunewald from 1918 to 1922, and it returned to Hoppegarten in 1923.

The race was abandoned in 1945 and 1946, and in the period thereafter it took place at Düsseldorf (1947), Cologne (1948) and Dortmund (1949). It was transferred to Gelsenkirchen in 1950.

The present system of race grading was introduced in Germany in 1972, and the Henckel-Rennen was classed at Group 2 level.

The event was moved to Cologne and renamed the Mehl-Mülhens-Rennen in 1986. It was named in memory of Maria Mehl-Mülhens (died 1985), a long-time owner of Gestüt Röttgen, a successful stud farm near Cologne.

Records
 Leading jockey (6 wins)
 Otto Schmidt – Lentulus (1922), Augias (1923), Favor (1925), Aurelius (1926), Effendi (1942), Neckar (1951)
 Leading trainer (10 wins)
 George Arnull – Monfalcone (1924), Alba (1930), Widerhall (1932), Sturmvogel (1935), Walzerkönig (1936), Orgelton (1938), Wehr Dich (1939), Magnat (1941), Aubergine (1949), Asterios (1950)
 Leading owner (18+ wins)
 Gestüt Schlenderhan – Dorn (1892), Real Scotch (1904), Prunus (1918), Monfalcone (1924), Alba (1930), Widerhall (1932), Sturmvogel (1935), Walzerkönig (1936), Orgelton (1938), Wehr Dich (1939), Magnat (1941), Aubergine (1949), Asterios (1950), Allasch (1953), Lombard (1970), Swazi (1976), Aviso (2007), Irian (2009)

Winners since 1968

Earlier winners

 1871: Bauernfänger
 1872: Seemann
 1873: Zwietracht
 1874: Herzog
 1875: Waisenknabe
 1876: Templer
 1877: Zützen
 1878: Lateran
 1879: Goldfisch
 1880: Tschungatai
 1881: Blue Monkey
 1882: Trachenberg
 1883: Ghibelline
 1884: Souvenir
 1885: Andernach
 1886: Potrimpos
 1887: Tausendkünstler
 1888: Padischah
 1889: Anarch
 1890: Nickel
 1891: Peter
 1892: Dorn
 1893: Königswinter
 1894: Herold
 1895: Nixnutz
 1896: Dahlmann
 1897: Argwohn
 1898: Altgold
 1899: Missouri
 1900: Griffin
 1901: Regenwolke
 1902: Frodi
 1903: Bengali
 1904: Real Scotch
 1905: Inverno
 1906: Fels
 1907: Fabula
 1908: Horizont
 1909: Fervor
 1910: Micado
 1911: Moenus
 1912: Flagge
 1913: Csardas
 1914: Terminus
 1915: Antinous
 1916: Taucher
 1917: Landgraf
 1918: Prunus
 1919: Eckstein
 1920: Pallenberg
 1921: König Midas
 1922: Lentulus
 1923: Augias
 1924: Monfalcone
 1925: Favor
 1926: Aurelius
 1927: Torero
 1928: Contessa Maddalena
 1929: Wilfried
 1930: Alba
 1931: Sichel
 1932: Widerhall
 1933: Cassius
 1934: Pelopidas
 1935: Sturmvogel
 1936: Walzerkönig
 1937: Iniga Isolani
 1938: Orgelton
 1939: Wehr Dich
 1940: Newa
 1941: Magnat
 1942: Effendi
 1943: Granatwerfer
 1944: Poet
 1945–46: no race
 1947: Nebelwerfer
 1948: Ostermorgen
 1949: Aubergine
 1950: Asterios
 1951: Neckar
 1952: Mangon
 1953: Allasch
 1954: Atatürk
 1955: König Ottokar
 1956: Kilometer
 1957: Orsini
 1958: Pfalzteufel
 1959: Waidmann
 1960: Wiener Walzer
 1961: Orlog
 1962: Herero
 1963: Mercurius
 1964: Dschingis Khan
 1965: Fioravanti
 1966: Krawall
 1967: Presto

See also
 List of German flat horse races

References

 Racing Post:
 galopp-sieger.de – 
 horseracingintfed.com – International Federation of Horseracing Authorities –  (2016).
 pedigreequery.com – 

Flat horse races for three-year-olds
Horse races in Germany
Sport in Cologne